Halyburton may refer to:

People
Andrew Halyburton (fl. 1490–1507), Scottish trade representative in the Netherlands
Hamilton Douglas Halyburton (1763–1783), British lieutenant
James Halyburton (disambiguation), several people
Thomas Halyburton (1674–1712), Scottish divine
William D. Halyburton, Jr. (1924–1945), World War II veteran of the United States Navy

Vessels
USS Halyburton (FFG-40), an Oliver Hazard Perry-class frigate of the United States Navy

See also
Haliburton (disambiguation)